Ulsan Grand Park is the largest urban park in South Korea, with  of park land. It is located in Ulsan Metropolitan City, and includes walking trails, a nature learning center, a botanical garden, a petting zoo, a butterfly zoo, and several playgrounds.

History 
Chey Tae-won, a former chairman of SK Group, began a money-saving program in 1995 to build a park in the city as a way of giving back to society. Construction began that year and finished in 2006. The total cost of the park was KRW102 billion (equivalent to approximately US$107 million in 2006), with SK paying about 60% of the money and the remaining 40% paid by the city.

See also 

 List of South Korean tourist attractions
 Seonam Lake Park
 Ulsan Museum – Located adjacent to the park

References

External links 
 Official English website for Ulsan Grand Park
 Official website for Korea tourism

Parks in Ulsan
Urban public parks
2006 establishments in South Korea
Nam District, Ulsan